Gateway Seminary ("GS") is a Baptist theological institute based in Ontario, California with campus in Fremont, California, Phoenix, Arizona, Vancouver, Washington, and Centennial, Colorado. It is affiliated with the Southern Baptist Convention.

The seminary is accredited by the Association of Theological Schools in the United States and Canada and the Western Association of Schools and Colleges. Jeff Iorg has been the seminary president since 2004.

History
The seminary was founded in 1944 as Golden Gate Baptist Theological Seminary by the Golden Gate Baptist Church and the First Southern Baptist Church of San Francisco in the Golden Gate Baptist Church of Oakland, California. In 2016, the Mill Valley, California campus moved to Ontario, California and the school was renamed Gateway Seminary.

Notable alumni
 Henry Blackaby – Minister and author of the popular Bible study "Experiencing God".
 John Christy - Distinguished Professor of Atmospheric Science and Director of the Earth System Science Center at The University of Alabama in Huntsville.
 Debby Kerner Rettino – Christian musician and worship leader
 J. Warner Wallace: homicide detective and Christian apologist

References

External links 
Official Seminary Website

Baptist organizations established in the 20th century
Baptist Christianity in California
Educational institutions established in 1944
Baptist seminaries and theological colleges affiliated with the Southern Baptist Convention
Seminaries and theological colleges in California
Universities and colleges in Marin County, California
Schools accredited by the Western Association of Schools and Colleges
1944 establishments in California